Megan Is Missing is a 2011 American found footage psychological horror film written, directed, edited, and co-produced by Michael Goi. The film revolves around the days leading up to the disappearance of Megan Stewart (Rachel Quinn), a popular high school student in North Hollywood who decided to meet up with a boy she was interacting with online, and the subsequent investigation launched by her best friend Amy Herman (Amber Perkins). Goi based the film on a series of real-life cases of child abduction. Marc Klaas, the founder of KlaasKids Foundation, notably endorsed the film.
 
Originally developed as a low-budget independent feature in 2006, the film was shot for $30,000–35,000. It did not find distribution until Anchor Bay Films gave it a limited theatrical release in 2011. The film was very controversial upon its release. Marketed as an educational film, Megan Is Missing was banned in New Zealand and has been heavily criticized by critics for its depiction of sexual violence and brutal imagery. Goi wrote the script in 10 days and shot the film over a week. Because of the graphic content, he requested that the parents of the young cast be on set during filming so that they were fully aware of their involvement in the project.

It is one of the first computer screen films. The film experienced renewed popularity in 2020 after clips of the film were shared on TikTok. Goi later issued public warnings to prospective viewers after many users began calling the film "traumatizing." Entertainment Weekly called it "2011's scariest horror film." The film placed sixth in the DEG Watched at Home Top 20 Chart for Week Ending November 21, 2020.

Plot
Megan Stewart and Amy Herman are 14-year-old best friends who vanished in January 2007. Investigators assembled web-chat videos, home movies, and news reports chronicling their disappearances to bring awareness to the importance of online safety for children. Megan is a high school honors student who is popular amongst her peers. However, as seen in web footage on January 2, she has a dysfunctional relationship with her mother and drug addiction. Amy is reluctant to let go of her childhood (as seen through her adoration of stuffed toys) and has a healthy relationship with her parents. Despite her close friendship with Megan, Amy is a target of bullying.

To help her fit in, Megan invites her to a rave party she's attending to celebrate Amy's upcoming birthday. From footage found the night of the party, Amy is visibly uncomfortable and gets assaulted when she refuses to have sex with one of the men attending. Amy walks in on Megan performing oral sex on the party's host in exchange for drugs, leaving her shocked. While video chatting, Megan apologizes for the bad experience. On Amy's birthday, she records a video diary on her new camera of her and Megan. Megan relates her life story to Amy and reveals that her stepfather is in prison for raping her at the age of nine. She explains that her hostile relationship with her mother is due to her never forgiving Megan for reporting him to authorities. Before she can cry, Amy quickly hugs and comforts her.

Lexie, one of Megan's party friends, gives her a social media handle to Josh, someone they think is a 17-year-old boy from a nearby school. He remains anonymous on video chat, claiming that he has a broken webcam. Despite several red flags and contradictions, Megan finds herself infatuated with him. They agree to meet at a party, but he fails to reveal himself. She confronts him online but forgives him when he accurately describes what she was wearing and insists he is shy.

Amy begins to feel left out, and while at Megan's house, Megan introduces her to him. Josh convinces Megan to meet him behind a diner (rather than public this time). On January 17, news reports reveal that Megan vanished and the last footage of her is from the diner's grainy security camera, showing her being grabbed by the wrist by an indistinct man. Amy launches an investigation into Megan's disappearance and talks online with Josh. After realizing Amy suspects him, he threatens her. Subsequently, graphic images of a tortured Megan's mouth, nostrils, and eyes forced open while immobilized in a contraption begin surfacing on fetish forums.

While recording a video diary underneath an old bridge where she'd share secrets with Megan, Amy is grabbed by a man. Investigators find her video camera in a garbage can. In unedited footage, Josh unlocks the door to a BDSM chamber with Amy chained to the wall. She begs for her teddy bear and he responds by making her eat food from a dog bowl without her hands. Josh later brutally rapes her, then tells her that he will let her go if she gets into a large plastic barrel to conceal his whereabouts. Amy opens the barrel and attempts to flee when she sees Megan's decaying corpse inside. She is forced inside alongside Megan's body and begs to live while Josh digs a large hole in a forest. He pushes the barrel in and fills it up before picking up his flashlight and walking away.

Cast
 Amber Perkins as Amy Herman
 Rachel Quinn as Megan Stewart
 Dean Waite as Josh
 Jael Elizabeth Steinmeyer as Lexie
 Kara Wang as Kathy
 Brittany Hingle as Chelsea
 Carolina Sabate as Angie
 Trigve Hagen as Gideon
 Curtis Wingfield as Ben
 April Stewart as Joyce Stewart
 Reyver Huante as Bill Herman
 Tammy Klein as Louise Herman
 Lauren Leah Mitchell as Callie Daniels
 Kevin Morris as Detective Simonelli

Production
Megan is Missing was made with a low budget, which is part of the reason for the found footage format. Goi self-financed the film as he believed that investors wouldn't fund it due to the violent script. It was shot over a week in 2008 with a small crew of only five people and a budget of $35,000. It had "no motion picture lighting equipment, no grip equipment, no professional sound recording equipment" to have a "raw" and realistic feel to it. The vast majority of the cast were adolescents, and Goi required that their parents be on the set during filming due to the graphic nature of the film.

The majority of the cast were inexperienced or first-time actors. The casting was intentional, as Goi wanted the characters to be portrayed by non-recognizable actors for the film to have an "air of reality." Rachel Quinn, a seventeen-year-old aspiring actress, and dancer got cast in the eponymous role of Megan Stewart. Amber Perkins, who had previously only done background work for television shows and commercials, was cast in the lead role of Amy Herman. This role marked her feature film debut. The role of the villain, Josh, was given to Australian actor Dean Waite.

In the controversial photographs used in the film, Quinn is legitimately wearing the torture device. Quinn describes wearing the headgear as her worst memory of filming. She attests this is because it was physically uncomfortable and mentally traumatizing when she realized what she was portraying. As the photographs are reality-based, Quinn asked Goi to show her the inspiration behind them. Upon seeing the real-life photographs she was reenacting, she began crying on the set. Quinn spent several hours having the special effects for Megan's corpse reveal applied to her and had to wear oversized white contact lenses that essentially blinded her when shooting in the barrel. Goi was very particular about the makeup direction for Megan's corpse. He wanted the audience to be able to tell that it's her, that she looked realistically dead, and to show that she suffered tremendously in the process of dying.

The basement scenes were challenging for Perkins. Quinn agreed to stay on the set, making it a more comfortable environment for her. Goi has stated that Waite's scenes were difficult to film for the actor. In particular, the rape scene of the Amy character was difficult for him, which required several reshoots. Goi recollects Waite becoming frustrated and cursing upon being told they had to refilm it. The burial scene of Waite digging the large hole in the forest was filmed in real time. Perkins ad libbed most of her dialogue in the barrel.

Reception
The film was controversial upon its limited release due to its graphic and exploitative depiction of violence and rape and the overt sexualization of the fourteen-year-old titular protagonist. Although, some critics have emphasized that Goi succeeds with the film having an impact.

Film critic Alexandra Heller-Nicholas deemed the purposeful amateur cinematography as aiding in the film's authentic feel. She notes the graphic photographs of Megan's torture mark the film's tonal shift and that the camera's gaze, belonging to the heroines at the beginning of the film, being turned against them "adds to the horrific revelations."

In a positive review for The Leaf-Chronicle (Tennessee), film critic Jamie Dexter compared the film to the Paranormal Activity franchise and The Blair Witch Project (1999) and praised the storyline. Stating, "It took days for me to shake the horrible feeling this movie left in me, but that just means it was effective in what it set out to do — show this real and plausible scenario of how internet predators work."

In a negative review for the Oklahoma Gazette, Rod Lott criticized Goi's characterization and handling of Megan and the acting from the rest of the cast.

Beyond Hollywood and DVD Verdict also panned the film, with Beyond Hollywood calling it "majorly disappointing" and DVD Verdict stating that they "[wished] this disc had been missing from the box". HorrorNews.net gave a more positive review, saying that the first portion of the film "really works", although they felt that the final twenty-two minutes "went a little overboard".

Monique Jones of Common Sense Media gave the film a one star out of five. Jones wrote that Goi's intended lesson within the film isn't successful by grisly imagery (as the ending is difficult to watch for some viewers) but by the film's early exploration of different characters' struggles. Beyond the violent conclusion, Jones emphasizes the film's early scenes succeed in pushing for conversations regarding online safety, healthy communication between parents or trusted adult figures and children, and reaching out for help. Jones wrote that it explores character issues in great detail, such as secrecy, a child's (Megan's) disregarded struggles with domestic abuse and trauma stemming from sexual abuse, peer pressure, and careless internet interactions with strangers.

Ban in New Zealand
In October 2011, New Zealand's Office of Film and Literature Classification banned Anchor Bay's release of this film by classifying it as "objectionable". They claimed that it contained sexual violence and sexual conduct involving young people to such an extent and degree, and in such a manner that if it was released it would be 'injurious to the public good'. They went on to say that it relished in the spectacle of one girl's ordeal, including a three-minute rape scene. They also stated that it sexualized the lives of young teenage girls to a "highly exploitative degree".

Popular culture and director's warnings 
In November 2020, the film became a pop culture sensation after it went viral on the video-sharing app TikTok. The platform is where the film has its largest audience since its release. Users began posting their reactions as the film progresses, with many calling it "traumatizing". The hashtag for the film has over 83 million views. After being informed by Perkins that the film had gone viral, Goi later issued a trigger warning for prospective viewers: "Do not watch the movie in the middle of the night. Do not watch the movie alone. And if you see the words 'photo number one' pop up on your screen, you have about four seconds to shut off the movie if you're already kind of freaking out before you start seeing things that maybe you don't want to see". Goi stated that he made the film with the purpose of it being a "wake-up call" to parents but instead it is children who discover the film and make it resurface sporadically. The film later began trending on Twitter.
The film was released on Blu-ray on October 26, 2021 via Lionsgate (current owners of the Anchor Bay library).

Remake and potential sequel
A few years after its release, a production company in Mexico approached Goi to make a Spanish language remake of the film with a Mexican cast. Goi declined the offer as he did not want to revisit the grim subject matter. However, he stated that he has theorized making a sequel but no progress has been made due to there being "no angle" for him to take the story.

References

Further reading

External links
 
 

2011 films
2011 horror films
2011 thriller films
2011 crime films
American psychological horror films
American crime thriller films
Films about missing people
American exploitation films
Found footage films
Films about rape
Films set in 2007
Crime horror films
Films about pedophilia
Films about the Internet
Obscenity controversies in film
American teen horror films
Films about kidnapping
Torture in films
Films about child death
Films directed by Michael Goi
Screenlife films
BDSM in films
2010s English-language films
2010s American films